Umiastowski-von Nandelstädt is a Polish noble-aristocratic family and one of oldest aristocratic lines in Central and Eastern Europe with records in Poland going back to 1238 (Rościsław Pierzchała-prefectus plociensis, haetmanus mazoviensis).

History

The Umiastowski family line is a Polish line. Their origins date back to the Piast dynasty period. The Umiastowskis possessed numerous estates in Mazovia, Kuyavia, and Lesser Poland. The progenitor of the family, Rościsław, was a starost of Płock and hetman under Konrad I of Masovia.

At one point in time the Umiastowskis settled in Livonia, an area now belonging to Latvia and Estonia. As of the 16th century the full family name has been von Nandelstädt Umiastowski, the first part being granted to them by Christina of Sweden.

Land holdings
The Umiastowski property included: 
In Livland: Schluckum, Waux-Moysen, Winkiel-Moysen
In the former Grand Duchy of Lithuania: Sobotniki, Żemłosław, Opita-Talkowszczyzna, Szakarnia, Czerwony Dwór, Stoki, Klewica, Puzyniewicze etc.

In Poland: Rękoraj
Two palaces in Vilnius
One palace in Warsaw

From Pierzchała to Umiastowski
The Pierzchała family changed their name from Pierzchała to Umiastowski in the 15th century, when they owned the town of Umiastów near Warsaw (in Duchy of Mazovia).

Members
Representatives of the family included:
Iwan comes Pierzchała - property Radomin (Duchy Stetin)- 14th century
Barbora Žagarietė - 17th century
Jan Kazimierz von Nandelstädt Umiastowski - 17th century

Władysław count Umiastowski - 19th century
Janina marchioness Umiastowski 19th and 20th century

Coat of arms and motto
Coat of arms: Roch III
Motto: Frangas non Flectas

External links
Two foundations exist established by this family:
Fondazione Romana Marchesa Umiastowska 
Fundacja Frangas non Flectas

Genealogy
Genealogy of the family comites Umiastowski(polish)

References

Bibliography
 Amiklar Kosiński - "Przewodnik Heraldyczny " Warszawa 1848
 Janina Umiastowska - Nałęcz - "Szmat Ziemi i Życia " Wilno 1928
 Czeslaw Jankowski - Powiat Oszmianski "Rodzina Umiastowskich" Wilno 1922
 Praca Zbiorowa: Szlachta Wielkiego Ksiestwa Litewskiego - Warszawa 1998
 Slawomir Leitgeber: Alamanach Blekitny - Poznan 1997 i wznowienia
 Archives of Foundation "Frangas non Flectas"